Juan López Galván, O.P. (April 21, 1613 – February 12, 1674) was a Roman Catholic prelate who served as Archbishop of Manila (1672–1674) and Bishop of Cebu (1663–1672).

Biography
Juan López Galván was born in Martín Muñoz de las Posadas, Spain. On February 10, 1663, he was ordained a priest of the Order of Friars Preachers. On April 23, 1663, Pope Alexander VII appointed him Bishop of Cebu where he succeeded Juan Velez, Bishop Elect of Cebu, who died before his consecration. On January 4, 1665, he was consecrated bishop by Marcos Ramírez de Prado y Ovando, Bishop of Michoacán. On November 14, 1672, Pope Clement X appointed him Archbishop of Manila where he served until his death on February 12, 1674.

References

External links and additional sources
 (for Chronology of Bishops) 
 (for Chronology of Bishops) 
 (for Chronology of Bishops) 
 (for Chronology of Bishops) 

1613 births
1667 deaths
Bishops appointed by Pope Alexander VII
Bishops appointed by Pope Clement X
Dominican bishops
Roman Catholic bishops of Cebu

Roman Catholic Archdiocese of Manila